The Ringaringa (Ringu-Ringu) were an indigenous Australian people of the state of Queensland.

Alternative names
 Ringoringo
 Ringu-ringu
 Ringa-ringaroo
 Yuntauntaya
 Njuntauntaya

Notes

Citations

Sources

Aboriginal peoples of Queensland